Zungu is a surname. Notable people with the surname include:

Bongani Zungu (born 1992), South African footballer
Lindelwe Zungu (born 1995), South African rugby union player 
Mussa Zungu (born 1952), Tanzanian politician
Philani Zungu, South African activist
Vincent Mduduzi Zungu (born 1966), South African bishop
Sandile Zithulele Zungu Maskandi Artist